Stomoxyini is a tribe of flies from the family Muscidae.

Genera
Bruceomyia Malloch, 1932 
Haematobia Le Peletier & Serville, 1828
Haematobosca Bezzi, 1907
Neivamyia Pinto & Fonseca, 1930
Parastomoxys Zumpt, 1973
Prostomoxys Zumpt, 1973
Rhinomusca Malloch, 1932
Stomoxys Geoffroy, 1762
Stygeromyia Austen, 1907

References

External links

Muscidae
Brachycera tribes
Muscomorph flies of Europe
Diptera of North America
Taxa named by Johann Wilhelm Meigen